The 2020 World Rugby Under 20 Championship was to have been the thirteenth edition of the premier age-grade rugby competition. The tournament was to be in Italy for the third time, previously being held in 2011 and 2015. Second-time champions France would have been the defending champions.

On 20 March 2020, World Rugby announced that the championship was cancelled due to the COVID-19 pandemic.

Teams
The following teams would have participated in the 2020 U20 Championship:

Pool stage
The pool stage fixture was to have been as follows:

Pool A
{| class="wikitable" style="text-align: center;"
|-
!width="200"|Team
!width="20"|Pld
!width="20"|W
!width="20"|D
!width="20"|L
!width="20"|PF
!width="20"|PA
!width="32"|−/+
!width="20"|TF
!width="20"|TA
!width="20"|BP
!width="20"|Pts
|- 
|align=left| 
| 0 || 0 || 0 || 0 || 0 || 0 || 0 || 0 ||  0 || 0 || 0
|- 
|align=left| 
| 0 || 0 || 0 || 0 || 0 || 0 || 0 || 0 ||  0 || 0 || 0
|-   
|align=left| 
| 0 || 0 || 0 || 0 || 0 || 0 || 0 || 0 ||  0 || 0 || 0
|-  
|align=left| 
| 0 || 0 || 0 || 0 || 0 || 0 || 0 || 0 ||  0 || 0 || 0
|}

Pool B
{| class="wikitable" style="text-align: center;"
|-
!width="200"|Team
!width="20"|Pld
!width="20"|W
!width="20"|D
!width="20"|L
!width="20"|PF
!width="20"|PA
!width="32"|−/+
!width="20"|TF
!width="20"|TA
!width="20"|BP
!width="20"|Pts
|- 
| align="left" | 
| 0 || 0 || 0 || 0 || 0 || 0 || 0 || 0 || 0 || 0 ||0
|-  
| align="left" | 
| 0 || 0 || 0 || 0 || 0 || 0 || 0 || 0 || 0 || 0 ||0
|-
| align="left" | 
| 0 || 0 || 0 || 0 || 0 || 0 || 0 || 0 || 0 || 0 ||0
|-  
| align="left" | 
| 0 || 0 || 0 || 0 || 0 || 0 || 0 || 0 || 0 || 0 ||0
|}

Pool C
{| class="wikitable" style="text-align: center;"
|-
!width="200"|Team
!width="20"|Pld
!width="20"|W
!width="20"|D
!width="20"|L
!width="20"|PF
!width="20"|PA
!width="32"|−/+
!width="20"|TF
!width="20"|TA
!width="20"|BP
!width="20"|Pts
|- 
|align=left| 
| 0 || 0 || 0 || 0 || 0 || 0 || 0 || 0 || 0 || 0 ||0
|-  
|align=left| 
| 0 || 0 || 0 || 0 || 0 || 0 || 0 || 0 || 0 || 0 ||0
|- style=
|align=left| 
| 0 || 0 || 0 || 0 || 0 || 0 || 0 || 0 || 0 || 0 ||0
|-  
|align=left| 
| 0 || 0 || 0 || 0 || 0 || 0 || 0 || 0 || 0 || 0 ||0
|}

References

World Rugby Under 20 Championship
World Rugby Under 20 Championship
World Rugby Under 20 Championship
World Rugby Under 20 Championship
World Rugby Under 20 Championship